Wiener Neustadt ([i.e. Lower Austria]) is a city located in the Steinfeld south of Vienna, in the state of Lower Austria, in northeast Austria. It is a self-governed city and the seat of the district administration of Wiener Neustadt-Land District. The city is the site of one of the world's oldest military academies, the Theresian Military Academy, which was established by Empress Maria Theresa of Austria in 1751 to train officers for the Austrian army.

History

The area once belonged to the County of Pitten, which had been inherited by Margrave Ottokar III of Styria in 1158. After the dynasty of the Otakars became extinct with the death of his son Ottokar IV, the Duchy of Styria passed to the Austrian House of Babenberg according to the Georgenberg Pact. Duke Leopold V of Austria established the town called Neustadt in 1194 and financed the construction of a fortress close to the Hungarian border with the ransom paid for the English king Richard the Lionheart, whom he had previously captured and held as a hostage at Dürnstein Castle. In 1241, a small Mongol squadron raided Neustadt during the Mongol incursions in the Holy Roman Empire but was later repulsed by Duke Friederich and his knights. In 1246 it was the scene of a victory of the Hungarians over the Austrians.

Neustadt gained important privileges given to the city in order to enable it to prosper. It remained a part of Styria, which after the 1278 Battle on the Marchfeld fell to the House of Habsburg and in 1379 became a constituent duchy of Inner Austria. In the 15th century, Wiener Neustadt experienced a population boom, when Emperor Frederick III of Habsburg took up a residence here and established the Diocese of Wiener Neustadt in 1469. His wife, Eleanor of Portugal, died in Wiener Neustadt in 1467, and the late Gothic church of the old Cistercian abbey contains a monument to her memory. The Wappenwand (coat-of-arms wall) at the local castle displays the coats of arms of his possessions in the middle. His son Maximilian I maintained his court in Wiener Neustadt and is buried here at St. George's Cathedral. The town then also had a significant Jewish commune with Rabbi Israel Isserlin as its most notable member, until all Jews were expelled by order of Emperor Maximilian I in 1496.

Habsburg's long-time rival King Matthias Corvinus of Hungary conquered the city in August 1487 after having laid siege to it for two years. According to legend he dedicated the magnificent Corvinus Cup to the inhabitants after his victory. Maximilian I managed to reconquer his native city in 1490. During the 16th century, Wiener Neustadt lost its status as imperial residence and much of its importance. However, it still fulfilled its function as bulwark against the Turks and the Kuruc.

The revocation of this patent helped to precipitate the Thirty Years' War.

In 1751 the city received greater attention when Empress Maria Theresa of Austria decided to dedicate the First Military Academy, worldwide, inside the imperial castle. In 1752, the Theresian Military Academy took up its operations, which have continued to this day with only a few interruptions (Erwin Rommel was appointed commandant after the Austrian Anschluss in 1938). In 1768, Wiener Neustadt was destroyed by an earthquake that damaged the castle, which was rebuilt using plans made by the architect Nicolò Pacassi. In 1785, Emperor Joseph II of Habsburg transferred the see of the Wiener Neustadt diocese to Sankt Pölten.

In the 19th century the city, which was almost entirely rebuilt after a destructive fire in 1834, became an industrial town, especially after the opening of the Austrian Southern Railway in 1841. In 1909, the "first official Austrian airfield" was inaugurated north of the city. It served as a training ground for the flight pioneers Igo Etrich, Karl Illner and Adolf Warchalowski, who conducted their tests there.

The Austro-Hungarian strike of January 1918 was started in Wiener Neustadt by workers from the Austro-Daimler factory, which was engaged in arms production, and inspired by the Bolshevik seizure of power to take strike action to oppose the war. A key factor in the strike was the halving of the flour ration. Porsche met the workers and agreed to drive to Vienna to speak to the Minister of Food. However his plea to the workers to return to work was ignored and they marched on the Town Hall. Here they were joined by other workers from the locomotive factory, the radiator works, the aircraft factory and local ammunition plants of G. Rath and the Lichtenwörther. On 14 January over 10,000 workers gathered outside the town hall to complain about the halving of the flour ration. Inspired by the Russian Revolution the workers set up Workers Councils.

During World War II, strategic targets in Wiener Neustadt, including the marshalling yards, the Wiener Neustädter Flugzeugwerke (WNF) factory, and two Raxwerke plants which used forced laborers imprisoned at Mauthausen-Gusen concentration camp, were repeatedly bombed. Bombing operations such as Operation Pointblank left only 18 of 4,000 buildings undamaged.

Climate
The average monthly temperatures are generally cool (see table below), with summer months reaching  and winter months reaching a few degrees above freezing in the daytime.

Main sights

 The Late-Romanesque cathedral, the Dom, consecrated in 1279 and constructed from 1469 to 1785. The choir and transept, in Gothic style, are from the 14th century. In the late 15th century 12 statues of the Apostles were added in the apse, while the bust of Cardinal Melchior Klesl is attributed to Gian Lorenzo Bernini.
 Former church of St. Peter an der Sperr, erected in the 13th century and modified in the mid-15th century by the imperial architect Peter von Pusica. Secularized in the 19th century, it is now used for exhibitions.
 The Theresian Military Academy, a 13th-century formerly four-towered castle which was later used as residence by Frederick III of Habsburg. The latter had it enlarged and the St. George Chapel built in the mid-15th century: it has notable glassworks and houses the tomb of Emperor Maximilian I. It became seat of the Academy in 1752. Destroyed during World War II, it has been rebuilt to the original appearance.

 Water tower
 Tower of Tortures (Reckturm, early 13th century), now housing a private weapons collection.
 Mariensäule (a plague column at Hauptplatz)
 Church of the Capuchins, documented from the 13th century. Of the original construction today the Gothic choir (late 14th century) and the statues of St. Mary and St. James can be seen.
 The medieval walls, built using part of the ransom of Richard I of England.
 Communal Museum of Wiener Neustadt 
 City archives
 Aviation museum Aviaticum
 Industrial museum
 Hospital museum

 Mineralogical museum
The Kasematten, a medieval fortification and expansion of the city walls, partially reconstructed and opened for visitors in preparation for the Lower Austrian exhibition 2019

Transportation
Wiener Neustadt Hauptbahnhof connects Wiener Neustadt with other major population centers. It is owned and operated by the ÖBB. Wiener Neustadt is also served by Autobahn.

The city has two airfields (the military Wiener Neustadt West Airport, the first airfield in Austria, and the civilian Wiener Neustadt East Airport) and is the starting point of Austria's only shipping canal, the Wiener Neustadt Canal, which was meant to reach out to Trieste but was never finished.

Local council
Elections in January 2020:
ÖVP 19 seats
SPÖ 11 seats
FPÖ 6 seats
The Greens – The Green Alternative 4 seats

Total: 40 seats

Mayors
 1467-1471: Johann Roll
 1945–1965: Rudolf Wehrl
 1965–1984: Hans Barwitzius
 1984–1993: Gustav Kraupa
 1993–1997: Peter Wittmann
 1997–2005: Traude Dierdorf
 2005–2015: Bernhard Müller
 since 2015: Klaus Schneeberger

University, professional schools, vocational academies
Austria's first and largest Fachhochschule for business and engineering, the University of Applied Sciences Wiener Neustadt, is located here.

City partnerships
  Monheim am Rhein, North Rhine-Westphalia, Germany
  Desenzano del Garda, Italy
  Harbin, People's Republic of China (PRC)

Development of the city
The most recent extension of the city is the Civitas Nova, Latin for new city, an ambitious project for an industrial, research and commercial center. In 2015, on the area of the Civitas Nova, a cancer treatment center for ion therapy was opened under the name of MedAustron.

Culture
In 1996 Wiener Neustadt received international attention as the so-called "sidewalk" designed by Japanese artist Tadashi Kawamata was built around the main square. Wiener Neustadt is the setting for the book Reluctant Return: A Survivor's Journey to an Austrian town.
 It was announced that Wiener Neustadt would host the European leg of Woodstock '99 over the weekend of July 16 to 18 1999. It was intended that up to 300,000 people would the festival, but the European leg of Woodstock '99 was ultimately canceled.

Sport

SC Wiener Neustadt played in the Austrian Football First League.

In 1995 Wiener Neustadt was the host of 1995 Speedway Grand Prix of Austria. It was the first, and so far, only Austrian SGP.

The European horseback jumping championships of 2015 for children, juniors and young riders was set up at Lake Arena, outside of Wiener Neustadt.

Wiener Neustadt played host to the sixth round of the 2018 Red Bull Air Race World Championship.

The city is home to a baseball and softball team called the "Diving Ducks", which have had success both within the country and internationally. They provide teams for various age groups, starting from the youngest team to the softball team "Crazy Chicklets", the adult team "Rubber Ducks" as well as their professional team the "Diving Ducks".

People 

 Maximilian I, Holy Roman Emperor
 Israel Isserlein, (1390–1460), Slovenian and German rabbi
 Queen Mariana of Spain (1634–1696)
 Johanna Beisteiner, (born 1976), classical guitarist
 Elazar Benyoëtz
 Thérèse de Dillmont writer on textiles
 Joseph Matthias Hauer, composer
 Karl Merkatz, actor
 Carl von In der Maur, Austrian statesman (1852–1913)
 Kurt Ingerl, (1935–1999), sculptor
 Irfan Skiljan, computer programmer and creator of IrfanView now working in Wiener Neustadt.
 Viktor Gernot, actor and comedian.
 Arnold Grabner, politician and Vice President of the OeOC
 Michael Haneke, (born 1942), film director
 Werner Schlager, Professional Table Tennis player
 Dominic Thiem, tennis player

Neighbouring municipalities
 Theresienfeld
 Neudörfl
 Lichtenwörth
 Katzelsdorf
 Weikersdorf am Steinfelde
 Bad Fischau-Brunn

References

External links

 
1194 establishments in Europe
Cities and towns in Lower Austria
Jewish communities in Austria
Jews and Judaism in Austria